The Roche-a-Cri Petroglyphs, also known as the Friendship Glyphs, are a Registered Historic Place in Roche-a-Cri State Park, near Friendship, Adams County, Wisconsin.  They consist of Oneota rock art, mostly petroglyphs resembling birds, canoes and geometric designs. They were added to the National Register of Historic Places in 1981. The petroglyphs were vandalized by soldiers and area settlers between 1845 and the 1880s, notably Company D of the Wisconsin 1st Cavalry Sharpshooters in 1861.

References

External links
Roche-A-Cri State Park Wisconsin Department of Natural Resources

Adams County, Wisconsin
Archaeological sites on the National Register of Historic Places in Wisconsin
Petroglyphs in Wisconsin
National Register of Historic Places in Adams County, Wisconsin
Vandalized works of art in Wisconsin